Eleni Daniilidou was the two-time defending champion, but was defeated in the first round by Mara Santangelo.

Katarina Srebotnik won the title, defeating Shinobu Asagoe in the final.

Seeds

Draw

Finals

Top half

Bottom half

References

WTA Auckland Open
Tennis tournaments in New Zealand
Sport in Auckland
2005 WTA Tour
2005 in New Zealand tennis